Michael Cuneo is an electrical engineer at the Sandia National Laboratories in Albuquerque, New Mexico.

Cuneo was named a Fellow of the Institute of Electrical and Electronics Engineers (IEEE) in 2014 for his contributions to inertial confinement fusion with magnetically-driven implosions and electrode cleaning.

References 

Fellow Members of the IEEE
Living people
Sandia National Laboratories people
Year of birth missing (living people)
American electrical engineers
Fellows of the American Physical Society